Sentry Siren, formerly known as Sterling Siren, is a civil defense siren brand.

History 
Sentry Siren was founded as the Interstate Machine Products Company of Rochester, New York in the very early 20th century. The company would later rename itself to the Sterling Siren and Fire Alarm Company in 1925. The company began producing sirens in 1902, producing small scale vehicular sirens, before beginning large scale siren production with the Model M series of sirens beginning in 1912, designed by Merton C. Armstrong. The Model M was used in fire warning, air-raid warning, and disaster warning and ended production in the 1980s to make way for a new line of sirens. The units were noted for their durability; a 1917 Model M siren is still in use today by the Manchester, Michigan Fire Department. Today, Model M units are considered collectibles by siren enthusiasts, due to rising rarity and simplicity to restore. Some other products that Sterling Siren produced were the "Little Giant", and the "VX-Series". 

In addition to civil defense sirens, Sterling manufactured fire truck and small industrial sirens, police call boxes, and even for a short time, washing machines.

In 1972, Sterling Siren went out of business and its siren designs were purchased by another company, which became Sentry Siren, based out of Canon City, Colorado.

In June 2020, the company relocated once more to a new production facility in Penrose, Colorado. The new production facility was built to increase office and manufacturing space for the growing company.

See also 
 Civil defense siren
 Civil defense
 Siren (noisemaker)

References

External links 

 Wayback Machine - Sentry Siren in 1998

Sirens
Civil defense